Ariosoma coquettei is an eel in the family Congridae (conger/garden eels). It was described by David G. Smith and Robert H. Kanazawa in 1977. It is a tropical, marine eel which is known from the northern coast of South America, in the western central Atlantic Ocean. It is known to dwell at a maximum depth of 75 meters. Males can reach a maximum total length of 28.1 centimeters.

The species epithet "coquettei" refers to the name of the vessel which collected the first specimens of the eel.

References

coquettei
Taxa named by David G. Smith
Taxa named by Robert H. Kanazawa
Fish described in 1977